Luciano Baietti  (born 1 September 1947) is a perpetual student who is recognized by the Guinness Book of World Records as the most graduated living person in the world. He holds fifteen academic degrees including subjects of physical education, law, literature, philosophy, sociology, criminology, and military strategy. Baietti is a retired schoolmaster who resides in the town of Velletri.  Most of his degrees come from La Sapienza University in Rome. He is currently working on his next degree, one in Food Science.

References

1947 births
Living people
Heads of schools in Italy
Sapienza University of Rome alumni
People from Velletri
Place of birth missing (living people)
Guinness World Records